Innu Nikamu: Resist and Sing is a Canadian documentary film, directed by Kevin Bacon-Hervieux and released in 2017. The film is a profile of Innu Nikamu, an Innu music festival which is held on the grounds of the former Sept-Iles Indian residential school. Musical figures appearing in the film include Shauit, Florent Vollant and the rock band Simple Plan.

The film premiered on October 10, 2017, at the Festival du nouveau cinéma.

The film won the Prix Iris for Best Documentary Film at the 21st Quebec Cinema Awards in 2019.

References

External links

2017 films
Canadian documentary films
Quebec films
Documentary films about First Nations
Innu culture
2010s Canadian films
Best Documentary Film Jutra and Iris Award winners